National Grand Bank of Marblehead is a bank headquartered in Marblehead, Massachusetts. It was named in honor of the brave "men o’ Marblehead" and their dangerous fishing voyages.

History
The bank was founded on March 17, 1831 as the Grand Bank, a state bank serving mariners and merchants.

On October 3, 1864, the bank voted to surrender the state charter and begin operating as a national bank. December 31, 1864, it received a federal bank charter and was renamed National Grand Bank of Marblehead, commencing national operations on February 1, 1865.

In 2002, the bank opened a student-operated branch in Marblehead High School.

References

Banks based in Massachusetts
American companies established in 1831
1831 establishments in Massachusetts
Banks established in 1831